Simon Alexander Hunt (born 26 May 1962) is a former English cricketer. Hunt was a right-handed batsman who bowled right-arm medium pace.  He was born at Guildford, Surrey.

Hunt made his Minor Counties Championship debut for Cornwall in 1984 against Cheshire. From 1984 to 1994, he represented the county in 13 Minor Counties Championship matches, the last of which came against Shropshire.  Hunt also represented Cornwall in the MCCA Knockout Trophy.  His debut in that competition came against Devon in 1984.  From 1984 to 1993, he represented the county in 4 Trophy matches, the last of which came against Wiltshire.

Lovell also represented Cornwall in a single List A match against Derbyshire in the 1986 NatWest Trophy.

References

External links
Simon Hunt at Cricinfo
Simon Hunt at CricketArchive

1962 births
Living people
Sportspeople from Guildford
People from Surrey
English cricketers
Cornwall cricketers
Cricketers from Surrey